Jan Van Steenberghe (born 4 July 1972) is a former Belgian football goalkeeper. He played most recently for F.C. Verbroedering Dender E.H., after being released from R.S.C. Anderlecht. His former clubs include Eendracht Aalst, R.A.A. Louviéroise and R.S.C. Anderlecht.

While at La Louvière he helped them win the 2002–03 Belgian Cup.

Honours

Club
La Louvière
Belgian Cup: 2003
Anderlecht
Belgian First Division: 2004, 2006, 2007
Belgian Super Cup: 2006

References

1972 births
Living people
Belgian footballers
Association football goalkeepers
S.C. Eendracht Aalst players
R.A.A. Louviéroise players
Royal Antwerp F.C. players
R.S.C. Anderlecht players
F.C.V. Dender E.H. players
Challenger Pro League players
Belgian Pro League players